Eburodacrys lanei is a species of beetle in the family Cerambycidae. It was described by Zajciw in 1958.

References

Eburodacrys
Beetles described in 1958